This is an episode list for the 1960s British television series The Avengers. The series was aired in Britain, on ITV, between 1961 and 1969.

The first four series were made in black-and-white. The first three were pre-recorded on videotape (except where noted) with occasional filmed inserts. Beginning with series 4 the series moved to all-film production, shot using the single-camera method. From series 5 onward, the episodes were filmed in colour. The sixth series was broadcast in the US before it was shown in the UK.

Series overview

Series 1 (1961) 
Note: The only episodes from the first series known to exist in complete form are "Girl on the Trapeze" (which does not feature John Steed), "The Frighteners" and "Tunnel of Fear"; additionally, the first 14 minutes—the first reel—of the premiere episode, "Hot Snow", have been rediscovered and released on DVD. The most recent discovery was in 2016, when "Tunnel of Fear" was found intact in a private collection.

Cast: Unless noted in the table below, all episodes in the first series feature Ian Hendry (as Dr. David Keel) and Patrick Macnee (as John Steed).

The first three series were all made in-house by ABC Weekend TV at their Teddington television studios.

Following series 1, a lengthy Equity actors' strike prevented development of the second series, and Ian Hendry decided to leave the show. When The Avengers eventually returned, its premise had been considerably retooled, with Macnee moved to the lead role, accompanied by an attractive and highly capable female sidekick, and a much more whimsical tone.

Series 2 (1962–1963)
Cast: Series 2 featured Patrick Macnee as John Steed in all 26 episodes. Either Jon Rollason (as Dr. Martin King, in 3 episodes) or Julie Stevens (as Venus Smith, in 6 episodes) accompanied him as noted in the table; with all of the other 17 episodes featuring Honor Blackman (as Mrs. Cathy Gale) accompanying Steed. All episodes intact.

NOTE: The episode "Death of a Great Dane" was later re-made during series 5 as "The £50,000 Breakfast".

Series 3 (1963–1964)
Cast: Series 3 stars Patrick Macnee as John Steed and Honor Blackman as Mrs. Cathy Gale. It was the last series to be shot "as live" on videotape.

NOTE: The episode "Don't Look Behind You" was later re-made for series 5 as "The Joker", "The Charmers" was re-made, again for series 5, as "The Correct Way to Kill" and "Dressed to Kill" was in large part re-made, once again for series 5, as "The Superlative Seven". At the end of the third series, Honor Blackman left The Avengers to star in the James Bond movie Goldfinger.

Series 4 (1965–1966)
Cast: Series 4 starred Patrick Macnee (as John Steed) and Diana Rigg (as Mrs Emma Peel). It was the last series to be made in black and white, but also the first series to be shot entirely on film as opposed to mainly on videotape.

Episodes of this series were first broadcast in the UK on Tuesdays by Scottish Television, before ABC Weekend broadcast them four days later on Saturday.

Starting with this series, the production budget was increased considerably, location shooting was used extensively. With an eye toward getting the series shown on US television, the show was now shot using 35mm film instead of being videotaped, leading to an increase in picture quality. This brought The Avengers in line with other contemporary ITV series such as Danger Man (airing in the US as Secret Agent) and The Saint.

Actress Elizabeth Shepherd was originally cast as Emma Peel; one complete episode, "The Town of No Return", was filmed. Partway through filming of the second episode, "The Murder Market", the producers closed down production in order to recast the part. The Shepherd footage has never been televised and is believed to be lost. Canal+ once claimed it had the original footage, then later retracted this claim. Publicity photos of Shepherd as Mrs. Peel survive.

For American broadcast, all episodes of the 1965–1966 series included a specially-shot prologue preceding the main credits, showing Steed and Peel walking across a giant chessboard while a narrator introduces the characters and the concept of the series. This opening never aired in the UK and wasn't widely seen in the show's home country until the DVD release.

The closing credits of all episodes of the fourth series credit the production company as "Associated British Productions Limited", the name of ABC Weekend's parent company's film production wing in Elstree, but at the very end the triangular logo of ABC Weekend TV appears with the caption "ABC production", as in previous series.

"The Strange Case of the Missing Corpse" was filmed in colour on the set of "Honey for the Prince" and was, as Brian Clemens originally wrote it, intended to be tagged on to the end of the final b/w episode transmitted in America to advertise the upcoming colour episodes (though the b/w sequence titled "Preamble for USA", written by Clemens to introduce the item, which was to have featured Rigg and Macnee explaining/introducing this short colour test film, is either lost or was never filmed). It was also cut down into a trailer for the colour episodes coming soon to ABC Network in America. Just like the prologue to the b/w Rigg episodes, it was never meant to be screened anywhere but the US. There is a myth that it was to have originally been a twenty-minute mini-episode, but the version presently available on video is three minutes long and doesn't appear to be missing any substantial narrative content.

Series 5 (1967)
Cast: This series featured Patrick Macnee (as John Steed) and Diana Rigg (as Emma Peel). From this series onwards, all episodes were filmed in colour, but as ITV did not begin colour transmissions until November 1969, all were originally broadcast in the UK in black and white.

Production of this series occurred in two batches. The first 16 episodes were broadcast in both the UK and the US from January to May 1967. The remaining 8 episodes were broadcast in the UK as a continuation of the fifth series from September to November 1967, but in the US they were delayed until January 1968 where they formed the first half of a new season.

January to May

"The Fear Merchants" was the first episode of The Avengers to be produced/filmed in colour, although "From Venus with Love" aired first.

The closing credits of all episodes of the fifth and sixth series credit the production company as "A.B.C. Television Films Limited", and at the very end an animation reveals the letters "ABC" to stand for "Associated British Corporation", a name apparently invented for ABC shows exported to the US to avoid confusion with the US ABC network.

September to November

Series 6 (1968–1969)
Cast: All episodes feature Patrick Macnee (as John Steed) and Linda Thorson (as Tara King). In episode 17, ("Killer") Tara makes a brief appearance before going on holiday. For the remainder of "Killer", Patrick Macnee as John Steed is paired with Jennifer Croxton as Lady Diana Forbes-Blakeney.

In episode 1 ("The Forget-Me-Knot"), Diana Rigg as Emma Peel makes her final appearance.

Patrick Newell (as "Mother") features in twenty of the episodes, with his mute sidekick "Rhonda" (Rhonda Parker) joining him for the latter eighteen.

The episode numbers in the table relate to the order in which they were first broadcast by Thames Television in the UK. Different ITV regions broadcast episodes on different dates and in different orders, so the Thames order does not match the order of first UK broadcast. Nearly all episodes in this series were shown, in a different order, in the US before they were shown in the UK.

John Bryce replaced Brian Clemens and Albert Fennell as producer for the start of series six. By the time Clemens and Fennell returned, three episodes had been filmed: two 90-minute episodes, named "Invitation To a Killing" and "The Great Great Britain Crime", as well as a standard-length episode, "Invasion of the Earthmen". These were considered to be extremely flawed episodes; they would likely have been scrapped, except that time did not exist in which to film new episodes and still meet the American contract. Hence, "Invitation To a Killing" was heavily edited and had several new shots filmed to become "Have Guns — Will Haggle", while "The Great Great Britain Crime" was heavily edited and had some old footage from previous episodes added, as well as some new footage, to become "Homicide and Old Lace". "Invasion of the Earthmen" was slightly edited as well. No known copies of the original versions of these episodes exist.

This series was produced in two batches: seven episodes (mostly without Patrick Newell as "Mother", and none with Rhonda Parker as "Rhonda") were added to the last eight Diana Rigg episodes for broadcast in the US in the spring of 1968: this made up the third series on ABC in America. On the original American broadcasts, these episodes featured the original 'Shooting Gallery' opening/closing titles featuring Tara in a tight-fitting tan outfit with a short skirt, and gunshots as Steed and Tara are shot at by an unseen gunman, which was filmed by Harry Booth. The seven episodes that aired in the US in the spring of 1968 aired in the following order: "The Forget-Me-Knot" on 20 March, "Invasion of the Earthmen" on 27 March, "The Curious Case of the Countless Clues" on 3 April, "Split!" on 10 April, "Get-A-Way" on 24 April, "Have Guns — will Haggle" on 1 May, and "Look- (Stop Me If You've Heard This One) But There Were These Two Fellers..." on 8 May.

These seven episodes were added sporadically into the 26 episodes produced in the next block, and the whole was transmitted in Britain as a single 33-episode run. The standard title sequences, the 'field/suits of armour' opening and 'playing card' ending, were filmed by Robert Fuest, originally for the first US transmission of the final 26 episodes, which made up the fourth series on the ABC network in America. These were tacked on to all 33 episodes when broadcast in the UK, apart from "The Forget-Me-Knot" which retained the amended Emma Peel opening credits and its original Tara King 'Shooting Gallery' end credit sequence.

By the time the sixth series came to be broadcast in the UK, ABC Weekend TV had ceased to exist: it had merged with Rediffusion London to become Thames Television. However all episodes of this series were still credited to A.B.C. Television Films as had the previous series.

Notes:
In the episode "Killer", Tara King is only seen departing for and returning from holiday. Steed's fellow agent for this episode is Lady Diana Forbes-Blakeney (played by Jennifer Croxton).
In the US, the field/suits of armour opening title sequence was re-edited to 23 seconds (the UK sequence runs 49 seconds), to accommodate more commercials.
The original 1968 German-dubbed episodes of this series had the field/suits of armour opening titles, but the 'Shooting Gallery' end titles.
The original 1968 French-dubbed episodes of this series featured a variant in the opening title music: a gunshot sound is heard during the shot of Tara running between two rows of suits of armour toward Steed, and the sound of the sword swipe at the beginning is missing.
The original title music for the opening 'Shooting Gallery' sequence featured gunshots. The version of the episode "Split!"—the only episode featuring this title sequence—that is included in the current DVD release (and aired on TV channel True Entertainment in the UK) nevertheless retains the standard title music, with the opening sword swipe sound effect where the first gunshot should be.

See also
The New Avengers

Notes

References

Lists of British action television series episodes
Lists of British crime television series episodes
Lists of British espionage television series episodes
Episodes